The Tower (XVI) (most common modern name) is the 16th trump or Major Arcana card in most Italian-suited tarot decks.  It has been used in Tarot cards since the 15th century as well as in divination since the mid-19th century.

History 

This card follows immediately after The Devil in all tarots that contain it, and is associated with sudden, disruptive revelation, and potentially destructive change. Some early painted decks, such as the Visconti-Sforza tarot, do not contain it, and some tarot variants used for gameplay omit it.

Early printed decks that preserve all their cards do feature The Tower. In these decks the card bears a number of different names and designs. In the Minchiate deck, the image usually shown is of two nude or scantily clad people fleeing the open door of what appears to be a burning building. In the Tarot of Paris (17th century), the image shown is of the Devil beating his drums, before what appears to be the mouth of Hell; the card still is called . The Tarot of Marseilles merges these two concepts, and depicts a burning tower being struck by lightning or fire from the sky, its top section dislodged and crumbling. Two men are depicted in freefall against a field of multicolored balls. Pamela Colman Smith's version is based on the Marseilles image, with small tongues of fire in the shape of Hebrew yod letters replacing the balls.

A variety of explanations for the images on the card have been attempted. For example, it may be a reference to the biblical story of the Tower of Babel, where God destroys a tower built by mankind to reach Heaven. Alternatively, the Harrowing of Hell was a frequent subject in the liturgical drama of the Late Middle Ages, and Hell could be depicted as a great gate knocked asunder by Jesus Christ. The Minchiate version of the deck may represent Adam and Eve's expulsion from the Garden of Eden.

Symbolism
The Tower is sometimes interpreted as meaning danger, crisis, sudden change, destruction, higher learning, and liberation. In the Rider–Waite deck, the top of The Tower is a crown, which symbolizes materialistic thought being bought cheap.

The Tower is associated with the planet Mars.

According to A. E. Waite's 1910 book The Pictorial Key to the Tarot, the Tower card is associated with:
16. THE TOWER.-- Misery, distress, indigence, adversity, calamity, disgrace, deception, ruin. It is a card in particular of unforeseen catastrophe. Reversed: Negligence, absence, distribution, carelessness, distraction, apathy, nullity, vanity.

Alternate decks 
 The Flemish Deck by Vandenborre renames it  ("The Thunderbolt"). It shows a frightened shepherd cowering under a burning tree split by a bolt of lightning while sheep graze at its base.
 In Anne Rice tarot deck the Tower card depicts Armand in the Vampire Chronicles.
 In X/1999, the Tower is Tokiko Magami & Tooru Shirou.
 In the Mythic Tarot deck, the Tower is depicted by Poseidon.
 In the Golden Dawn system it corresponds to the Hebrew letter Peh, and in the French system it corresponds to Ayin.
 In the Twin Peaks tarot deck by Ben Mackey, the Tower card depicts the destruction of the Packard Sawmill from Episode 7.

References 

 A. E. Waite's 1910 Pictorial Key to the Tarot

External links 
 

Major Arcana
Mars in culture
Fictional towers